Neuvic is a commune in the Corrèze department in central France.

Geography
The Triouzoune forms the commune's eastern boundary, then flows into the Dordogne, which forms part of the commune's southern boundary.

Population

See also
Communes of the Corrèze department

References

Communes of Corrèze
Limousin